The Ultima Evolution is a limited production sports car built by British automobile manufacturer Ultima Sports. It was unveiled as the replacement for the Ultima GTR on 9 April 2015. It is sold both as a kit car, which the buyers build themselves, or as a complete vehicle, built at the factory, and is available in either a coupé or a convertible bodystyle. The range-topping supercharged LS-powered model is reported to cost £95,995 ($122,332).

Specifications

Engine 
The Evolution is powered by 3 different engines, all derivatives of the LS based GM small-block engine. The power outputs of these three engines are as follows: 
 6.2 L LS3 V8: 
 7.0 L LS7 V8: 
 6.8 L supercharged LS V8:  and 
The engine is mid mounted and the car has a rear-wheel-drive layout.

Transmission and suspension 
The Evolution is equipped with a 6-speed manual transmission manufactured by Porsche and mounted longitudinally on the car. The car uses double wishbone suspension on the front and rear axles, with coilover springs that allow for adjustment of bump, rebound, and ride height.

Chassis 
The car's chassis is a tubular steel space frame panelled with 5251 aluminum alloy, and has a built-in roll cage for structural rigidity and safety. The car's body is made out of glass-reinforced plastic, with optional carbon fibre wing mirrors and front splitter.

Wheels 
The Evolution is equipped with  forged alloy wheels with an optional  upgrade available. The tyres are manufactured by Michelin with codes of 245/35 for the front and 335/30 for the rear.

Interior features 
The Evolution's seats and dashboard are finished in leather and Alcantara depending on the selected options. In place of a center console, the Evolution features a large, stainless steel gear lever and handbrake. The in-car entertainment system and optional satellite navigation system are manufactured by Alpine Electronics.

Performance
Below is a table of manufacturer-claimed performance values for the three different engine configurations of the Ultima Evolution.

References

External links

Ultima Evolution official website

Rear mid-engine, rear-wheel-drive vehicles
Sports cars
Ultima vehicles
Cars introduced in 2015